Vesko Kountchev (born Vesselin Valentinov Kountchev on January 17, 1974 in Sofia, Bulgaria) is a musician.

Early life

Vesko Kountchev (Веско Кунчев) was born in Sofia, Bulgaria. Son of Valentin Kountchev (Валентин Кунчев) artist, musician member of Sofia Philharmonic Orchestra and mother Vitka Ignatova Boeva (proektant).
Vesko starts at 5 years old playing violin, under Professor Alexander Serafimov guidance. At 10 years old he assist to the L. Pipkov National Music School Sofia. In this period he studies classical music as well as rock and contemporary music. Vesko becomes member of the alternative group Dissident influenced by Voivod,
Slayer, Nirvana, Mr. Bungle, Nine Inch Nails, playing drums and viola.

Early years and ÑU

In 20 of September 1992 he went to Madrid to continue his study in the Real Conservatorio Superior de Música de Madrid Spain. During this time he was invited by José Carlos Molina  to become member of ÑU an important progressive rock group based in Madrid between 1995 and 1999.

Projects and bands

As part of his Madrid staying, Vesko participates in various projects, recordings and concerts since 1993 to 2007 with bands like: Samarluna (fusion) Rosana (pop), Angel Moreno Cuarteto (flamenco fusion), Pedro Sanz (flamenco),Labanda (Spanish progressive rock) Inma Serrano, Atmarama Dasa (spiritual music), Macaco - Rumbo Submarino (alternative world music), Undrop (alternative rock, reggae), Dhira (Latin, hip hop, alternative), Orchestre International du Vetex (balcan Latin beat), L.E.Flaco  (hip-hop), Cows in Love (spiritual funk alternative), Barxino (Latin electronic beat), Cefalu (alternative Arab indie) etc.

From 2001 Amparo Sánchez invites Vesko to become member of Amparanoia, playing the viola and composing besides Amparo and the other group members, since the album "Somos Viento", "Enchilao" and "La Vida te da".

Studio records

Amparo Sanchez “Tucson Habana” – 2010
Amparanoia, “Seguire Caminando” – 2008
Undrop,“Party“ 2008
Cows in Love, “Terminal Goloca“ 2007
Orchestre Internacional du Vetex, “Flamoek Fantasy“ 2007
Barxino,“Barcelona Mondo Beat Nacion Electrolatina“ 2006
Atmarama, "Divine Service"
Atmarama Dasa, “Sri Sri Radha Govinda Chandra“
Gio Connections "Gio Connections" 2006
Dhira,"Dhira Sound System"  2005
RadioChango "Añejo Reserva vol.I" 2005
Putumayo Presents, "Latin Lounge" 2005
La Bongo, "Festival"
Per Palestina, "Recopilatorio" 2003
Ñu, “Requiem”  2002
Ñu, "Esperando" 2002
Macaco, “Rumbo Submarino”  2002
Undrop , “Uprooted”  2001
No Hay Dos Sin Tres, “No hay dos sin tres”  2001
Ñu, “Colección” 2001
Pedro Sanz, “Yunque, Martillo y Estribo”  2000
Ñu, “Cuatro Gatos” 1999
Ñu,"La Danza de las Mil Tierras"
Undrop, “Boomerang” 1999
Atmarama Dasa, "Sri Siksastakam" 1999
Namaste, by Rafa de Guillermo 1999
Angel Moreno Cuarteto, "Trilogia" 1999
Inma Serrano, "Rosas de Papel" 1998
Ñu, "La Noche del Juglar"  Grabado en directo 6 de Marzo de 1998
Ñu, “La Taberna Encantada” 1997
Angel Moreno Cuarteto, "La Torre Del Tiempo" 1998
Angel Moreno Cuarteto, "Estrella del Alba" 1996

Albums with Amparanoia
Amparanoia, “Seguiré Caminando” 2 CDS + 1 DVD, 25 marzo 2008
Amparanoia, “La Vida Te Da” 2006
Amparanoia, “Rebeldía Con Alegría” 2004
Amparanoia, “Enchilao”  2003
Amparanoia, “Somos Viento”  2002

DVD
Amparanoia, “Seguiré Caminando”  DVD 2008
Amparanoia, “La Vida Te Da¨  DVD 2006

Singles
Barxino,“Barxino”– 2006
Amparanoia,“Dolor Dolor, Alerta, Trabajar” – 2003
Amparanoia,“Dolor Dolor” – 2003
Amparanoia,“Si Fuera” – 2003
Amparanoia,“Ella Baila Bembe” – 2002
Amparanoia,“Mar Estrecho” – 2002
Amparanoia,“Somos Viento” – 2002
Amparanoia,“La Fiesta” – 2002
No Hay Dos Sin Tres,“Locura” – 2001
Undrop, “Uprooted Promo single” – 2000
Undrop, “Mineffield Radio Version” – 2000

External links
 Vesko Kountchev Official Photography Web Site

1974 births
Living people
Bulgarian rock musicians
Musicians from Sofia
Rock en Español musicians
Bulgarian expatriates in Spain